Moosehead is an unincorporated community in Dennison Township, Luzerne County, Pennsylvania, United States.

Notable person
A. Mitchell Palmer (1872-1936), lawyer and United States Attorney General, was born in Moosehead.

Notes

Unincorporated communities in Luzerne County, Pennsylvania
Unincorporated communities in Pennsylvania